is a Sōtō temple in Nakatsu, Oita Prefecture, Japan. The temple stands on the mountainside of Mt. Rakan, the rocky cliff of which has countless mouths of caves. The main gate and the main hall stand directly in the rocky cliff. In the caves, over 3,700 stone Buddhas are enshrined.

The temple was established in 1337, but it was destroyed by fire in 1943. The present main hall was reconstructed in 1969.

Gallery

External links 

Rakan-ji Official Website (in Japanese)
Oita Prefecture Official Website (in English) 

Buddhist temples in Oita Prefecture
Soto Zen